Sargent's Purchase is a township in Coös County, New Hampshire, United States. It lies within the White Mountain National Forest. As of the 2020 census, the population was zero.

In New Hampshire, locations, grants, townships (which are different from towns), and purchases are unincorporated portions of a county which are not part of any town or city and have limited self-government (if any, as many are uninhabited).

History
The first known explorer to have set foot in what is now known as Sargent's Purchase was Darby Field, who claimed to have made the first ascent of Mount Washington in 1642. Sargent's Purchase was granted to Jacob Sargent and others on May 31, 1832. In May 1866, Sylvester Marsh of Campton, New Hampshire, began construction of the Mount Washington Cog Railway, primarily in Thompson and Meserve's Purchase, but the uppermost half mile being within Sargent's Purchase. The Cog Railway was completed in 1869.

Geography 
The Appalachian Trail crosses the northwest part of the township, including the summit of Mount Washington, as well as the northeast corner of the township.

The Ammonoosuc River has its source on the west side of Mount Washington and drains the northwest corner of the township, part of the Connecticut River watershed. The northeast corner of the township, drained by the Peabody River, is part of the Androscoggin River watershed. The remainder of the township is part of the Saco River watershed: the Dry River begins in Oakes Gulf on the south side of Mount Washington, while the Ellis River begins in Tuckerman Ravine on the east side of the mountain. The Rocky Branch, a third tributary of the Saco, drains the southern part of Sargent's Purchase.

Demographics 

As of the 2020 census, there were no permanent residents in the township.

Notes

References

Townships in Coös County, New Hampshire
Berlin, New Hampshire micropolitan area
Townships in New Hampshire